The 2012–13 Utah Jazz season was the franchise's 39th season in the National Basketball Association (NBA), and the 34th season of the franchise in Salt Lake City. Despite a 43-39 record, the Jazz missed the playoffs. Had the Jazz been in the weaker eastern conference, they would have been the 7th seed over the 41-40 Boston Celtics and the 38-44 Milwaukee Bucks.

Key dates
 June 28:The NBA draft took place at the Prudential Center in Newark, New Jersey.

Draft picks

Roster

Preseason

|- bgcolor="ffcccc"
| 1
| October 8
| @ Golden State
| 
| Marvin Williams,Paul Millsap (13)
| Enes Kanter (11)
| Mo Williams, Jamaal Tinsley (6)
| Oracle Arena14,571
| 0–1
|- bgcolor="#bbffbb"
| 2
| October 12
| Oklahoma City
| 
| Mo Williams (15)
| Enes Kanter (12)
| Al Jefferson (3)
| Energy Solutions Arena17,786
| 1–1
|- bgcolor="#bbffbb"
| 3
| October 13
| @ L.A Lakers
| 
| Marvin Williams,Enes Kanter (14)
| Enes Kanter (14)
| Mo Williams (7)
| Staples Center18,372
| 2–1
|- bgcolor="#bbffbb"
| 4
| October 16
| @ L.A Lakers
| 
| Gordon Hayward (14)
| Al Jefferson,Paul Millsap (7)
| Derrick Favors,DeMarre Carroll (4)
| Honda Center13,896
| 3–1
|- bgcolor="ffcccc"
| 5
| October 17
| @ L.A. Clippers
| 
| Randy Foye (17)
| Enes Kanter (9)
| Jamaal Tinsley (7)
| Staples Center14,617
| 3–2
|- bgcolor="#bbffbb"
| 6
| October 20
| L.A. Clippers
| 
| Marvin Williams (18)
| Paul Millsap (9)
| Mo Williams (8)
| Energy Solutions Arena18,741
| 4–2
|- bgcolor="ffcccc"
| 7
| October 22
| @ Portland
| 
| Enes Kanter (18)
| three players (6)
| Mo Williams (7)
| Rose Garden19,150
| 4–3
|- bgcolor="#bbffbb"
| 8
| October 25
| Portland
| 
| Enes KanterDerrick Favors (21)
| Enes Kanter (12)
| Jamaal Tinsley (6)
| EnergySolutions Arena18,247
| 5–3
|-

Regular season

Standings

Game log

|- style="background:#cfc;"
| 1
| October 31
| Dallas
| 
| Marvin Williams,Mo Williams (21)
| Paul Millsap (15)
| Mo Williams (6)
| Energy Solutions Arena17,634
| 1–0

|- style="background:#fcc;"
| 2
| November 2
| @ New Orleans
| 
| Randy Foye (20)
| Derrick Favors (9)
| Jamaal Tinsley (6)
| New Orleans Arena14,147
| 1–1
|- style="background:#fcc;"
| 3
| November 3
| @ San Antonio
| 
| Mo Williams (29)
| Paul Millsap (10)
| Mo Williams (9)
| AT&T Center18,581
| 1–2
|- style="background:#fcc;"
| 4
| November 5
| @ Memphis
| 
| Gordon Hayward (19)
| Al Jefferson (10)
| Mo Williams (8)
| FedExForum17,401
| 1-3
|- style="background:#cfc;"
| 5
| November 7
| L. A. Lakers
| 
| Al Jefferson (18)
| Al Jefferson (10)
| Mo Williams (7)
| Energy Solutions Arena19,911
| 2-3
|- style="background:#fcc;"
| 6
| November 9
| @ Denver
| 
| Gordon Hayward (15)
| Favors & Jefferson (11)
| Jamaal Tinsley (7)
| Pepsi Center15,523
| 2-4
|- style="background:#cfc;"
| 7
| November 10
| Phoenix
| 
| Al Jefferson (27)
| Al Jefferson (14)
| Jamaal Tinsley (14)
| Energy Solutions Arena19,100
| 3-4
|- style="background:#cfc;"
| 8
| November 12
| @ Toronto
| 
| Paul Millsap (34)
| Al Jefferson (17)
| Mo Williams (14)
| Air Canada Centre18,230
| 4-4
|- style="background:#fcc;"
| 9
| November 14
| @ Boston
| 
| Paul Millsap (20)
| Al Jefferson (14)
| Mo Williams (5)
| TD Garden18,624
| 4-5
|- style="background:#fcc;"
| 10
| November 16
| @ Philadelphia
| 
| Paul Millsap (22)
| Al Jefferson (9)
| Jamaal Tinsley (6)
| Wells Fargo Center15,851
| 4-6
|- style="background:#cfc;"
| 11
| November 17
| @ Washington
| 
| Al Jefferson (21)
| Al Jefferson (13)
| Mo Williams (6)
| Verizon Center16,210
| 5-6
|- style="background:#cfc;"
| 12
| November 19
| Houston
| 
| Gordon Hayward (15)
| Al Jefferson (16)
| Jamaal Tinsley (11)
| Energy Solutions Arena19,197
| 6-6
|- style="background:#cfc;"
| 13
| November 23
| Sacramento
| 
| Gordon Hayward (23)
| Derrick Favors (14)
| Jamaal Tinsley (12)
| Energy Solutions Arena18,000
| 7-6
|- style="background:#fcc;"
| 14
| November 24
| @ Sacramento
| 
| Randy Foye (17)
| Paul Millsap (8)
| Jamaal Tinsley (7)
| Sleep Train Arena12,239
| 7-7
|- style="background:#cfc;"
| 15
| November 26
| Denver
| 
| Al Jefferson (28)
| Derrick Favors (7)
| Jamaal Tinsley (6)
| Energy Solutions Arena18,776
| 8-7
|- style="background:#cfc;"
| 16
| November 28
| @ New Orleans
| 
| Al Jefferson (19)
| Favors & Millsap (8)
| Jamaal Tinsley (5)
| New Orleans Arena10,693
| 9-7
|- style="background:#fcc;"
| 17
| November 30
| @ Oklahoma City
| 
| Enes Kanter (18)
| Al Jefferson (11)
| Earl Watson (8)
| Chesapeake Energy Arena18,203
| 9-8

|- style="background:#fcc;"
| 18 || December 1 || @ Houston
| 
| Gordon Hayward (21)
| Paul Millsap (11)
| Mo Williams (7)
| Toyota Center14,432
| 9-9
|- style="background:#fcc;"
| 19 || December 3 || L. A. Clippers
| 
| Mo Williams (20)
| Al Jefferson (10)
| Mo Williams (12)
| EnergySolutions Arena19,067
| 9-10
|- style="background:#cfc;"
| 20 || December 5 || Orlando
| 
| Al Jefferson (31)
| Al Jefferson (15)
| Mo Williams (7)
| EnergySolutions Arena18,078
| 10-10
|- style="background:#cfc;"
| 21 || December 7 || Toronto
| 
| Paul Millsap (20)
| Paul Millsap (10)
| Mo Williams (10)
| EnergySolutions Arena18,069
| 11-10
|- style="background:#cfc;"
| 22 || December 9 || @ L. A. Lakers
| 
| Paul Millsap (24)
| Al Jefferson (11)
| Mo Williams (9)
| Staples Center18,997
| 12-10
|- style="background:#cfc;"
| 23 || December 12 || San Antonio
| 
| Paul Millsap (24)
| Paul Millsap (12)
| Gordon Hayward (6)
| EnergySolutions Arena18,710
| 13-10
|- style="background:#fcc;"
| 24 || December 14 || @ Phoenix
| 
| Al Jefferson (14)
| Al Jefferson (11)
| Mo Williams (7)
| US Airways Center14,182
| 13-11
|- style="background:#fcc;"
| 25 || December 15 || Memphis
| 
| Al Jefferson (21)
| Al Jefferson (8)
| Mo Williams (7)
| EnergySolutions Arena18,183
| 13-12
|- style="background:#cfc;"
| 26 || December 18 || @ Brooklyn
| 
| Mo Williams (19)
| Al Jefferson (11)
| Mo Williams (6)
| Barclays Center15,835
| 14-12
|- style="background:#fcc;"
| 27 || December 19 || @ Indiana
| 
| Derrick Favors (16)
| Favors, Kanter& Millsap (9)
| Earl Watson (4)
| Bankers Life Fieldhouse13,559
| 14-13
|- style="background:#fcc;"
| 28 || December 22 || @ Miami
| 
| Marvin Williams (16)
| Al Jefferson (11)
| Watson & Mo Williams (4)
| American Airlines Arena20,087
| 14-14
|- style="background:#cfc;"
| 29 || December 23 || @ Orlando
| 
| Paul Millsap (18)
| Al Jefferson (9)
| Earl Watson (8)
| Amway Center17,721
| 15-14
|- style="background:#fcc;"
| 30 || December 26 || Golden State
| 
| Al Jefferson (18)
| Al Jefferson (10)
| Jamaal Tinsley (4)
| EnergySolutions Arena19,404
| 15-15
|- style="background:#fcc;"
| 31 || December 28 || L. A. Clippers
| 
| Randy Foye (28)
| Al Jefferson (8)
| Jamaal Tinsley (5)
| EnergySolutions Arena19,911
| 15-16
|- style="background:#fcc;"
| 32 || December 30 || @ L. A. Clippers
| 
| Al Jefferson (30)
| Carroll & Jefferson (8)
| Jamaal Tinsley (11)
| Staples Center19,111
| 15-17

|- style="background:#cfc;"
| 33 || January 2 || Minnesota
| 
| Gordon Hayward (17)
| Enes Kanter (8)
| Earl Watson (9)
| EnergySolutions Arena19,120
| 16-17
|- style="background:#cfc;"
| 34 || January 4 || @ Phoenix
| 
| Al Jefferson (21)
| Paul Millsap (10)
| Earl Watson (8)
| US Airways Center14,874
| 17-17
|- style="background:#fcc;"
| 35 || January 5 || @ Denver
| 
| Paul Millsap (15)
| Al Jefferson (8)
| Jamaal Tinsley (5)
| Pepsi Center19,155
| 17-18
|- style="background:#cfc;"
| 36 || January 7 || Dallas
| 
| Gordon Hayward (27)
| Al Jefferson (11)
| Jamaal Tinsley (6)
| EnergySolutions Arena18,600
| 18-18
|- style="background:#cfc;"
| 37 || January 9 || @ Charlotte
| 
| Al Jefferson (26)
| Al Jefferson (8)
| Jamaal Tinsley (8)
| Time Warner Cable Arena13,347
| 19-18
|- style="background:#fcc;"
| 38 || January 11 || @ Atlanta
| 
| Randy Foye (25)
| Paul Millsap (13)
| Jamaal Tinsley (9)
| Philips Arena12,064
| 19-19
|- style="background:#cfc;"
| 39 || January 12 || @ Detroit
| 
| Al Jefferson (20)
| Al Jefferson (10)
| Earl Watson (6)
| The Palace of Auburn Hills18,441
| 20-19
|- style="background:#cfc;"
| 40 || January 14 || Miami
| 
| Al Jefferson (23)
| Al Jefferson (11)
| Jamaal Tinsley (7)
| EnergySolutions Arena19,911
| 21-19
|- style="background:#cfc;"
| 41 || January 19 || Cleveland
| 
| Randy Foye (20)
| Al Jefferson (11)
| Earl Watson (9)
| EnergySolutions Arena19,911
| 22-19
|- style="background:#cfc;"
| 42 || January 23 || Washington
| 
| Paul Millsap (16)
| Paul Millsap (15)
| Jamaal Tinsley (6)
| EnergySolutions Arena18,158
| 23-19
|- style="background:#fcc;"
| 43 || January 25 || @ L. A. Lakers
| 
| Derrick Favors (14)
| Al Jefferson (7)
| Jamaal Tinsley (6)
| Staples Center18,997
| 23-20
|- style="background:#cfc;"
| 44 || January 26 || Indiana
| 
| Al Jefferson (25)
| Al Jefferson (6)
| Jamaal Tinsley (9)
| EnergySolutions Arena19,201
| 24-20
|- style="background:#fcc;"
| 45 || January 28 || Houston
| 
| Randy Foye (20)
| Al Jefferson (6)
| Alec Burks (4)
| EnergySolutions Arena18,387
| 24-21
|- style="background:#cfc;"
| 46 || January 30 || New Orleans
| 
| Paul Millsap (25)
| Paul Millsap (10)
| Randy Foye (8)
| EnergySolutions Arena17,490
| 25-21

|- style="background:#cfc;"
| 47 || February 1 || Portland
| 
| Al Jefferson (21)
| Derrick Favors (12)
| Earl Watson (7)
| EnergySolutions Arena19,512
| 26-21
|- style="background:#fcc;"
| 48 || February 2 || @ Portland
| 
| Randy Foye (23)
| Paul Millsap (8)
| Jamaal Tinsley (6)
| Rose Garden20,376
| 26-22
|- style="background:#cfc;"
| 49 || February 4 || Sacramento
| 
| Randy Foye (20)
| Al Jefferson (12)
| Randy Foye (6)
| EnergySolutions Arena17,742
| 27-22
|- style="background:#cfc;"
| 50 || February 6 || Milwaukee
| 
| Jefferson & Millsap (19)
| Favors & Jefferson (11)
| Millsap & Tinsley (5)
| EnergySolutions Arena18,571
| 28-22
|- style="background:#fcc;"
| 51 || February 8 || Chicago
| 
| Al Jefferson (32)
| Al Jefferson (13)
| Foye & Tinsley (6)
| EnergySolutions Arena19,911
| 28-23
|- style="background:#fcc;"
| 52 || February 9 || @ Sacramento
| 
| Alec Burks (24)
| Favors & Millsap (8)
| Tinsley & Watson (5)
| Sleep Train Arena16,193
| 28-24
|- style="background:#cfc;"
| 53 || February 12 || Oklahoma City
| 
| Al Jefferson (23)
| Paul Millsap (10)
| Tinsley & Millsap (6)
| EnergySolutions Arena18,552
| 29-24
|- style="background:#cfc;"
| 54 || February 13 || @ Minnesota
| 
| Paul Millsap (21)
| Al Jefferson (11)
| Alec Burks (7)
| Target Center13,117
| 30-24
|- align="center"
|colspan="9" bgcolor="#bbcaff"|All-Star Break
|- style="background:#cfc;"
| 55 || February 19 || Golden State
| 
| Al Jefferson (24)
| Paul Millsap (9)
| Tinsley & Watson (5)
| EnergySolutions Arena18,231
| 31-24
|- style="background:#fcc;"
| 56 || February 23 || @ L. A. Clippers
| 
| Gordon Hayward (23)
| Derrick Favors (8)
| Earl Watson (8)
| Staples Center19,165
| 31-25
|- style="background:#fcc;"
| 57 || February 25 || Boston
| 
| Gordon Hayward (26)
| Al Jefferson (11)
| Paul Millsap (5)
| EnergySolutions Arena19,911
|31-26
|- style="background:#fcc;"
| 58 || February 27 || Atlanta
| 
| Al Jefferson (26)
| Derrick Favors (15)
| Earl Watson (5)
| EnergySolutions Arena19,267
| 31-27

|- style="background:#cfc;"
| 59 || March 1 || Charlotte
| 
| Enes Kanter (23)
| Enes Kanter (22)
| Jamaal Tinsley (5)
| EnergySolutions Arena17,691
| 32-27
|- style="background:#fcc;"
| 60 || March 4 || @ Milwaukee
| 
| Derrick Favors (23)
| Derrick Favors (15)
| Gordon Hayward (5)
| BMO Harris Bradley Center13,926
| 32-28
|- style="background:#fcc;"
| 61 || March 6 || @ Cleveland
| 
| Gordon Hayward (25)
| Derrick Favors (12)
| Gordon Hayward (7)
| Quicken Loans Arena12,124
| 32-29
|- style="background:#fcc;"
| 62 || March 8 || @ Chicago
| 
| Al Jefferson (23)
| Derrick Favors (10)
| Jamaal Tinsley (5)
| United Center21,842
| 32-30
|- style="background:#fcc;"
| 63 || March 9 || @ New York
| 
| Alec Burks (14)
| Marvin Williams (7)
| Marvin Williams (4)
| Madison Square Garden19,033
| 32-31
|- style="background:#cfc;"
| 64 || March 11 || Detroit
| 
| Marvin Williams (20)
| Al Jefferson (10)
| Marvin Williams (6)
| EnergySolutions Arena18,568
| 33-31
|- style="background:#fcc;"
| 65 || March 13 || @ Oklahoma City
| 
| Gordon Hayward (20)
| Paul Millsap (7)
| Earl Watson (6)
| Chesapeake Energy Arena18,203
| 33-32
|- style="background:#cfc;"
| 66 || March 16 || Memphis
| 
| Gordon Hayward (17)
| Gordon Hayward (8)
| Marvin Williams (6)
| EnergySolutions Arena17,122
| 34-32
|- style="background:#fcc;"
| 67 || March 18 || New York
| 
| Gordon Hayward (17)
| Derrick Favors (13)
| Marvin Williams (5)
| EnergySolutions Arena18,494
| 34-33
|- style="background:#fcc;"
| 68 || March 20 || @ Houston
| 
| Gordon Hayward (27)
| Al Jefferson (11)
| Marvin Williams (6)
| Toyota Center15,739
| 34-34
|- style="background:#fcc;"
| 69 || March 22 || @ San Antonio
| 
| Mo Williams (23)
| Al Jefferson (13)
| Mo Williams (8)
| AT&T Center18,581
| 34-35
|- style="background:#fcc;"
| 70 || March 24 || @ Dallas
| 
| Enes Kanter (17)
| Paul Millsap (9)
| Mo Williams (8)
| American Airlines Center19,821
| 34-36
|- style="background:#cfc;"
| 71 || March 25 || Philadelphia
| 
| Randy Foye (20)
| Derrick Favors (13)
| Mo Williams (8)
| EnergySolutions Arena17,336
| 35-36
|- style="background:#cfc;"
| 72 || March 27 || Phoenix
| 
| Gordon Hayward (25)
| Derrick Favors (13)
| Mo Williams (10)
| EnergySolutions Arena16,949
| 36-36
|- style="background:#cfc;"
| 73 || March 29 || @ Portland
| 
| Mo Williams (28)
| Paul Millsap (10)
| Gordon Hayward (8)
| Rose Garden19,527
| 37-36
|- style="background:#cfc;"
| 74 || March 30 || Brooklyn
| 
| Randy Foye (26)
| Derrick Favors (9)
| Paul Millsap (9)
| EnergySolutions Arena18,008
| 38-36

|- style="background:#cfc;"
| 75 || April 1 || Portland
| 
| Al Jefferson (24)
| Al Jefferson (10)
| Mo Williams (9)
| EnergySolutions Arena18,336
| 39-36
|- style="background:#fcc;"
| 76 || April 3 || Denver
| 
| Gordon Hayward (18)
| Al Jefferson (9)
| Mo Williams (7)
| EnergySolutions Arena17,654
| 39-37
|- style="background:#cfc;"
| 77 || April 5 || New Orleans
| 
| Gordon Hayward (23)
| Mo Williams & Favors (10)
| Millsap & Tinsley (7)
| EnergySolutions Arena18,023
| 40-37
|- style="background:#cfc;"
| 78 || April 7 || @ Golden State
| 
| Mo Williams (25)
| Derrick Favors (13)
| Gordon Hayward (6)
| Oracle Arena19,596
| 41-37
|- style="background:#fcc;"
| 79 || April 9 || Oklahoma City
| 
| Mo Williams (19)
| Al Jefferson (11)
| Mo Williams (6)
| EnergySolutions Arena19,610
| 41-38
|- style="background:#cfc;"
| 80 || April 12 || Minnesota
| 
| Al Jefferson (40)
| Al Jefferson (13)
| Al Jefferson (6)
| EnergySolutions Arena19,609
| 42-38
|- style="background:#cfc;"
| 81 || April 15 || @ Minnesota
| 
| Al Jefferson (22)
| Millsap & Jefferson (8)
| Mo Williams (7)
| Target Center17,009
| 43-38
|- style="background:#fcc;"
| 82 || April 17 || @ Memphis
| 
| Al Jefferson (22)
| Al Jefferson (16)
| Mo Williams & Favors (3)
| FedExForum16,777
| 43-39

Transactions

Overview

Trades

Free agents

References

Utah Jazz seasons
Utah
Utah
Utah